In mathematics, the Kolmogorov continuity theorem is a theorem that guarantees that a stochastic process that satisfies certain constraints on the moments of its increments will be continuous (or, more precisely, have a "continuous version"). It is credited to the Soviet mathematician Andrey Nikolaevich Kolmogorov.

Statement

Let  be some complete metric space, and let  be a stochastic process. Suppose that for all times , there exist positive constants  such that

for all . Then there exists a modification  of  that is a continuous process, i.e. a process  such that

  is sample-continuous;
 for every time , 

Example

See also
 Kolmogorov extension theorem

References

  p. 51

Theorems regarding stochastic processes